The Lebanon Borough School District is a community public school district that serves students in pre-kindergarten through sixth grade from Lebanon Borough, in Hunterdon County, New Jersey, United States.

As of the 2018–19 school year, the district, comprising one school, had an enrollment of 40 students and 13.8 classroom teachers (on an FTE basis), for a student–teacher ratio of 2.9:1. In the 2016–17 school year, Lebanon had the 9th-smallest enrollment of any school district in the state, with 101 students.

The district is classified by the New Jersey Department of Education as being in District Factor Group "I", the second-highest of eight groupings. District Factor Groups organize districts statewide to allow comparison by common socioeconomic characteristics of the local districts. From lowest socioeconomic status to highest, the categories are A, B, CD, DE, FG, GH, I and J.

Students in seventh and eighth grades attend Clinton Township Middle School in Clinton Township as part of a sending/receiving relationship with the Clinton Township School District. As of the 2018–19 school year, the high school had an enrollment of 479 students and 57.0 classroom teachers (on an FTE basis), for a student–teacher ratio of 8.4:1.

Public school students in ninth through twelfth grades attend North Hunterdon High School in Annandale together with students from Bethlehem Township, Clinton Town, Clinton Township, Franklin Township and Union Township. As of the 2018–19 school year, the high school had an enrollment of 1,584 students and 123.2 classroom teachers (on an FTE basis), for a student–teacher ratio of 12.9:1. The school is part of the North Hunterdon-Voorhees Regional High School District, which also includes students from Califon, Glen Gardner, Hampton, High Bridge, Lebanon Township and Tewksbury Township, who attend Voorhees High School in Lebanon Township.

School
The Lebanon Borough School served an enrollment of 93 students as of the 2018–19 school year.

Administration
Core members of the district's administration are:
Bruce Arcurio, Superintendent
Tricia Duell, Board Secretary / Business Administrator

Board of education
The district's board of education, comprised of five members, sets policy and oversees the fiscal and educational operation of the district through its administration. As a Type II school district, the board's trustees are elected directly by voters to serve three-year terms of office on a staggered basis, with either one or two seats up for election each year held (since 2012) as part of the November general election. The board appoints a superintendent to oversee the day-to-day operation of the district.

References

External links
 Lebanon Borough School District
 
 School Data for the Lebanon Borough School District, National Center for Education Statistics
 Clinton Township School District
 North Hunterdon-Voorhees Regional High School District

Lebanon, New Jersey
New Jersey District Factor Group I
School districts in Hunterdon County, New Jersey
Public elementary schools in New Jersey